Kevin Francis Mithen (14 April 1936 – 23 July 2014) was an Australian rules footballer who played with Melbourne and South Melbourne in the Victorian Football League (VFL).

Notes

External links 

1936 births
2014 deaths
Australian rules footballers from Victoria (Australia)
Melbourne Football Club players
Sydney Swans players
Ormond Amateur Football Club players